Sara Errani was the defending champion, but was unable to participate due to a doping suspension.

Zheng Saisai won the title, defeating Jana Čepelová in the final, 7–5, 6–1.

Seeds

Draw

Finals

Top half

Bottom half

References
Main Draw

Suzhou Ladies Open - Singles